The 2015 Atlantic Sun Conference softball tournament was held at FGCU Softball Complex on the campus of the Florida Gulf Coast University in Fort Myers, Florida, from May 6 through May 9, 2015.  The tournament winner, USC Upstate, defeated Lipscomb in the Championship final 9-1 to earn the Atlantic Sun Conference's automatic bid to the 2015 NCAA Division I softball tournament. All games were streamed online on ESPN3.

Tournament

All times listed are Eastern Daylight Time.

References

Atlantic Sun Tournament
Tournament, 2015